Spain competed at the 1962 European Athletics Championships in Belgrade, Yugoslavia, from 12–16 September 1962.

Results

Men
Track & road events

Field events

Nations at the 1962 European Athletics Championships
1962
European Athletics Championships